Suvacal (also, Suvadzhal) is a village and municipality in the Qusar Rayon of Azerbaijan.  It has a population of 670.

References 

Populated places in Qusar District